Alamania punicea is a species of epiphytic orchids and the only species of the genus Alamania. It is endemic to Mexico and has two recognized varieties:

Alamania punicea subsp. greenwoodiana Soto Arenas & R.Jiménez - Hidalgo, Oaxaca, Puebla, Querétaro, San Luis Potosí, Veracruz
Alamania punicea subsp. punicea - similar range

Description
Small, epiphytic plant that prefers a cool climate, it has an ovoid pseudobulb with 2 to 3 coriaceous, oblong-elliptic, obtuse, articular, basal and broad leaves that blooms in an erect, terminal, cluster-shaped inflorescence that can carry one to nine red-orange flowers. It produces its flowering in the spring and early summer.

References

External links
IOSPE orchid species photos

Laeliinae genera
Monotypic Epidendroideae genera
Orchids of Mexico
Epiphytic orchids
Laeliinae